The 26th Texas Cavalry Regiment was a unit of mounted volunteers from Texas that fought in the Confederate States Army during the American Civil War. The unit first organized in August 1861 as the 7th Texas Cavalry Battalion with seven companies for the purpose of patrolling the Texas Gulf Coast. In January 1862, three companies were added, and the unit was renamed the 26th Texas Cavalry Regiment. The original colonel resigned and was replaced by Xavier Debray, a Frenchman educated at Saint-Cyr military academy. Constant drilling gave the unit its reputation as one of the best disciplined in Texas. Until 1864, the regiment only fought minor skirmishes with Union landing parties. That year it fought at Mansfield and Pleasant Hill in the Red River Campaign. Instead of disbanding in May 1865, the regiment stayed intact and briefly guarded the city of Houston against marauders.

See also
List of Texas Civil War Confederate units

Notes

References

Units and formations of the Confederate States Army from Texas
1861 establishments in Texas
1865 disestablishments in Texas
Military units and formations disestablished in 1865
Military units and formations established in 1861